The Pakistan Kabaddi Federation PKF is the national governing body to develop and promote the sport of kabaddi in Pakistan. The federation manages the Pakistan national kabaddi team.

History 
The federation was formed in 1964 in Islamabad. It is based in Islamabad. It organized the first Pakistan Standard Style Kabaddi League, the Super Kabaddi League.

Affiliations 
The federation is affiliated with:
 International Kabaddi Federation
 Asian Kabaddi Federation
 Pakistan Sports Board
 Pakistan Olympic Association

See also
 Pakistan national kabaddi team
 Super Kabaddi League

External links
 Official Website
 Mostbet Pakistan

References

Sports governing bodies in Pakistan
Kabaddi in Pakistan
Sports organizations established in 1964
1964 establishments in Pakistan